Prnjavor is a village in the municipality of Plav, Montenegro.

Demographics
According to the 2011 census, its population was 961.

Notable people 
Agan Koja, local imam and political activist

References

Populated places in Plav Municipality